Jurgen Ekkelenkamp (born 5 April 2000) is a Dutch professional footballer who plays as a midfielder for Belgian First Division A club Royal Antwerp.

Club career

Ajax
Ekkelenkamp made his professional debut in the Eerste Divisie for Jong Ajax on 9 April 2018 in a game against FC Den Bosch. His Eredivisie debut for Ajax followed on 19 April 2018 in the game against VVV-Venlo. On 10 April 2019 Ekkelenkamp made his UEFA Champions League debut, coming on in the 71st minute for Lasse Schöne in the quarter-final match against Juventus at the Johan Cruyff Arena. The match ended in a 1–1 draw, with Ekkelenkamp receiving cult-status in the Netherlands and the nickname 'Ronaldo-gooier' (English: Ronaldo thrower) after he committed a professional foul against Cristiano Ronaldo in the closing minutes of the match. Ajax later went on to defeat Juventus 2–1 in the return leg, making their first semi-final appearance in the tournament since 1997.

Hertha BSC
Ekkelenkamp joined Bundesliga side Hertha BSC on 27 August 2021. He made his debut on 17 September 2021, in a league game against SpVgg Greuther Fürth; he scored just one minute after being substituted in for Kevin-Prince Boateng, tying the score as the match ended in a 2–1 win for Hertha.

Royal Antwerp
On 7 August 2022, Ekkelenkamp joined Belgian First Division A club Royal Antwerp.

Career statistics

Club
As of 9 December 2022.

Honours
Jong Ajax
 Eerste Divisie: 2017–18

Ajax
 Eredivisie: 2019–20, 2020–21
 KNVB Cup: 2019–20, 2020–21
Johan Cruyff Shield: 2019

References

External links
 

Living people
2000 births
People from Zeist
Association football midfielders
Dutch footballers
Netherlands under-21 international footballers
Netherlands youth international footballers
AFC Ajax players
Jong Ajax players
Hertha BSC players
Royal Antwerp F.C. players
Eredivisie players
Eerste Divisie players
Bundesliga players
Belgian Pro League players
Dutch expatriate footballers
Expatriate footballers in Germany
Expatriate footballers in Belgium
Dutch expatriate sportspeople in Germany
Dutch expatriate sportspeople in Belgium
Footballers from Utrecht (province)